The Sverdlovsk plane crash of 5 January 1950 killed all 19 persons on board, including almost the entire ice hockey team (VVS Moscow) of the Soviet Air Forces – 11 players, as well as a team doctor and a masseur. The team was on board a twin-engined Lisunov Li-2 transport aircraft, a licensed Soviet-built version of the DC-3, heading to a match against Dzerzhinets Chelyabinsk. Due to poor weather at Chelyabinsk, the flight diverted to Sverdlovsk. The crew attempted four approaches but during the fifth approach to Koltsovo Airport the aircraft crashed near the airport in a heavy snowstorm with strong winds.

Among those killed in the crash was goalkeeper Harijs Mellups.

See also
List of accidents involving sports teams

References

Airliner accidents and incidents caused by weather
Aviation accidents and incidents in the Soviet Union
Aviation accidents and incidents in Russia
Aviation accidents and incidents in 1950
Sverdlovsk air disaster
Aviation accidents and incidents involving professional sports teams
Sver
January 1950 events in Europe
Accidents and incidents involving the Douglas DC-3
1950 disasters in the Soviet Union